Singhwahini is a Gram Panchayat in Bihar. Arun Kumar husband of Ritu Jaiswal is Mukhiya of this Panchayat. From Singhwahini view of Himalayas looks Stunning.

Nearby places 
Sitamarhi - 33 KM
Motihari - 76 KM
Madhubani - 83 KM
Darbhanga - 91 KM
Muzaffarpur - 93 KM

References 

Gram panchayats in Bihar